{| class="wikitable sortable plainrowheaders" 
|-
! scope="col" | Award
! scope="col" | Year
! scope="col" | Nominee(s)
! scope="col" | Category
! scope="col" | Result
! scope="col" class="unsortable"| 
|-
!scope="row" rowspan=2|ASCAP Pop Music Awards
| 1984
| "Here Comes the Rain Again"
| rowspan=2|Most Performed Songs
| 
| 
|-
| 1994
| "Walking on Broken Glass"
| 
| 
|-
!scope="row" rowspan=16|Billboard Music Awards
| 1983
| "Sweet Dreams (Are Made of This)"
| Top Hot 100 Song
| 
|
|-
| 1984
| rowspan=6|Eurythmics
| Top Disco Artist – Duo/Group
| 
|
|-
| rowspan=9|1985
| Top Artist
| 
| rowspan=9|
|-
| Top Billboard 200 Artist
| 
|-
| Top Hot 100 Artist
| 
|-
| Top Hot 100 Artist – Duo/Group
| 
|-
| Top Dance Club Play Artist
| 
|-
| rowspan=2|Be Yourself Tonight
| Top Billboard 200 Album
| 
|-
| Top Compact Disk
| 
|-
| "Would I Lie to You?"
| Top Hot 100 Song
| 
|-
| "Sexcrime"
| Top Dance Play Single
| 
|-
| rowspan=2|1986
| rowspan=2|Eurythmics
| Top Billboard 200 Artist
| 
| rowspan=2|
|-
| Top Hot 100 Artist
| 
|-
| 2002
| rowspan=2|Herself
| Century Award
| 
| 
|-
| rowspan=2|2004
| Top Hot Dance Club Play Artist
| 
| rowspan=2|
|-
| "A Thousand Beautiful Things"
| Top Hot Dance Club Play Single
| 
|-
!scope="row"|Billboard Music Video Awards
| 1992
| "Why"
| Best Pop/Rock Female Video
| 
| 
|-
!scope="row" rowspan=20|Brit Awards
| rowspan=2|1984
| Eurythmics
| British Group
| 
| rowspan=2|
|-
| rowspan=3|Herself
| rowspan=3|British Female Solo Artist
| 
|-
| 1985
| 
| 
|-
| rowspan=3|1986
| 
| rowspan=3|
|-
| Eurythmics
| British Group
| 
|-
| Be Yourself Tonight
| British Album of the Year
| 
|-
| 1987
| Eurythmics
| British Group
| 
| 
|-
| 1989
| rowspan=2|Herself
| rowspan=2|British Female Solo Artist
| 
| 
|-
| rowspan=4|1990
| 
| rowspan=4|
|-
| Eurythmics
| British Group
| 
|-
| We Too Are One
| British Album of the Year
| 
|-
| "Don't Ask Me Why"
| British Video of the Year
| 
|-
| 1992
| rowspan=2|Herself
| rowspan=2|British Female Solo Artist
| 
| 
|-
| rowspan=3|1993
| 
| rowspan=3|
|-
| Diva
| British Album of the Year
| 
|-
| "Walking on Broken Glass"
| British Video of the Year
| 
|-
| 1996
| rowspan=1|Herself
| rowspan=1|British Female Solo Artist
| 
| 
|-
| 1999
| Eurythmics
| Outstanding Contribution to Music
| 
| 
|-
| 2004
| rowspan=1|Herself
| rowspan=1|British Female Solo Artist
| 
| 
|-
| 2010
| "There Must Be an Angel"
| Live Performance of 30 Years
| 
| 
|-
!scope="row" rowspan=3|British LGBT Awards
| 2015
| rowspan=3|Herself
| Best Music Artist
| 
| 
|-
| 2017
| rowspan=2|Celebrity Ally
| 
| 
|-
| 2018
| 
| 
|-
!scope="row" rowspan=3|ECHO Awards
| 1992
| Eurythmics
| Best International Group
| 
| 
|-
| 1993
| rowspan=2|Herself
| rowspan=2|Best International Female
| 
| 
|-
| 1996
| 
| 
|-
!scope="row"|Edison Awards
| 1986
| Eurythmics
| Best International Pop
| 
| 
|-
!scope="row" rowspan=15|Grammy Awards
|1984
|Eurythmics
|Best New Artist
|
| rowspan=15|
|-
| 1985
|Eurythmics Sweet Dreams: The Video Album
|Best Video Album
|
|-
|rowspan="2"| 1986
|"Sisters Are Doin' It for Themselves" (with Aretha Franklin)
|Best R&B Performance by a Duo or Group with Vocal
|
|-
|"Would I Lie to You?"
|rowspan="2"|Best Rock Performance by a Duo or Group with Vocal
|
|-
| 1987
|"Missionary Man"
|
|-
| 1990
|Savage
|rowspan="3"|Best Music Video – Long Form
|
|-
| 1991
|We Two Are One Too
|
|-
|rowspan="3"| 1993
|rowspan="3"|Diva
|
|-
|Album of the Year
|
|-
|rowspan="2"|Best Female Pop Vocal Performance
|
|-
|rowspan="2"| 1996
|"No More 'I Love You's
|
|-
|Medusa
|rowspan="2"|Best Pop Vocal Album
|
|-
| 2004
|Bare
|
|-
| 2005
|"Into the West"
|Best Song Written for a Motion Picture, Television or Other Visual Media
|
|-
| 2015
|Nostalgia
|Best Traditional Pop Vocal Album
|
|-
!scope="row" rowspan=2|Hungarian Music Awards
| rowspan=2|1993
| rowspan=2|Diva
| Best Foreign Album
| 
| rowspan=2|
|-
| Best Foreign Video
| 
|-
!scope="row"|International Dance Music Awards
| 2004
| "A Thousand Beautiful Things"
| Best Progressive/Trance Track
| 
| 
|-
!scope="row" rowspan=12|Ivor Novello Awards
| rowspan=2|1984
| "Sweet Dreams (Are Made of This)"
| The Best Pop Song
| 
| rowspan=2|
|-
| rowspan=2|Eurythmics
| rowspan=2|Songwriters of the Year
| 
|-
| rowspan=3|1987
| 
| rowspan=3|
|-
| "It's Alright (Baby's Coming Back)"
| Best Contemporary Song
| 
|-
| "The Miracle of Love"
| rowspan=2|Best Song Musically & Lyrically
| 
|-
| rowspan=2|1993
| rowspan=2|"Why"
| 
| rowspan=2|
|-
| International Hit of the Year
| 
|-
| 1994
| "Little Bird"
| rowspan=2|Most Performed Work
| 
| 
|-
| rowspan=3|1996
| rowspan=3|"No More 'I Love You's'"
| 
| rowspan=3|
|-
| Best Song Musically & Lyrically
| 
|-
| International Hit of the Year
| 
|-
| 1998
| "Step by Step"
| Best Original Song for a Film or Broadcast
| 
| 
|-
!scope="row" rowspan=18|MTV Video Music Awards
| 1984
|"Sweet Dreams (Are Made of This)"
|Best New Artist
|
| 
|-
|rowspan=5|1985
|rowspan=5|"Would I Lie to You?"
|Best Stage Performance
|
| rowspan=5|
|-
|Best Overall Performance
|
|-
|Best Choreography
|
|-
|Best Editing
|
|-
|rowspan=2|Best Group Video
|
|-
|rowspan=5|1987
|rowspan=5|"Missionary Man"
|
| rowspan=5|
|-
|Best Concept Video
|
|-
|Most Experimental Video
|
|-
|Best Special Effects
|
|-
|Best Editing
|
|-
|rowspan=2|1988
|"I Need a Man"
|Best Group Video
|
| rowspan=2|
|-
|"You Have Placed a Chill in My Heart"
|Best Direction
|
|-
| 1989
| "Put a Little Love in Your Heart"
| Best Video from a Film
| 
| 
|-
|rowspan="2"| 1992
| rowspan="2"|"Why"
| International Viewer's Choice - MTV Europe
|
| rowspan=2|
|-
|rowspan=3|Best Female Video
|
|-
| 1993
| "Walking on Broken Glass"
| 
| 
|-
| 1995
| "No More 'I Love You's
|
| 
|-
!scope="row" rowspan=2|Pollstar Concert Industry Awards
| 1987
| Revenge Tour
| Small Hall Tour of the Year
| 
| 
|-
| 2005
| Sacred Love Tour (with Sting)
| Most Creative Tour Package
| 
| 
|-
!scope="row" rowspan=2|Rockbjörnen
| rowspan=2|1986
| Eurythmics
| Best Foreign Group
| 
| rowspan=2|
|-
| Revenge
| Best Foreign Album
|

References

Lists of awards received by British musician
Annie Lennox